USS Yosemite may refer to more than one United States Navy ship:

 , an auxiliary cruiser that fought in the Spanish–American War, in commission from 1898 until scuttled in 1900
 , a steamer in commission from 1911 to 1912
 , a minelayer which bore the name from 1931 to 1939 while out of commission in reserve; formerly USS Tahoe (CM-2), and before that was the protected cruiser USS San Francisco (C-5, later CM-2)
 , a destroyer tender in commission from 1944 to 1994